Ursini may refer to:

 Ursini (surname)
 Ursini (Araneidae), a spider tribe in the subfamily Araneinae comprising only the genus Ursa
 Ursini (Ursinae), a tribe in the subfamily Ursinae (the bears)
 a section in the subgenus Rubus of the genus Rubus taxonomy
 a small bipedal alien species in the Mythology of Stargate